Berbenno di Valtellina (Lombard: Berbènn) is a comune (municipality) in the Province of Sondrio in the Italian region Lombardy, located about  northeast of Milan and about  west of Sondrio.

Berbenno di Valtellina borders the following municipalities: Buglio in Monte, Cedrasco, Colorina, Fusine, Postalesio, Torre di Santa Maria.

Demographic evolution

References

External links
 www.comune.berbenno.so.it

Cities and towns in Lombardy